The 2006 Florida Marlins season was the 14th in Marlins franchise history; an American Major League Baseball team based in Miami Gardens, Florida. They finished the season in fourth place in the National League East Division. They are notable for greatly exceeding expectations and remaining close in the Wild Card race until September, despite having the lowest payroll in the Major Leagues and using primarily rookies and low priced veterans. They also became the first team in MLB history to be at least 20 games under .500 (11-31), and at any point in the same season be a game over .500 (69-68). The team ultimately fell short of a Wild Card berth, and failed to make the playoffs for the 3rd consecutive season.

Offseason
November 24, 2005: Hanley Ramírez was traded by the Boston Red Sox with Jesus Delgado (minors), Harvey Garcia, and Aníbal Sánchez to the Florida Marlins for Josh Beckett, Mike Lowell, and Guillermo Mota.
November 24, 2005: Carlos Delgado was traded by the Florida Marlins with cash to the New York Mets for Mike Jacobs, Yusmeiro Petit, and Grant Psomas (minors).
December 5, 2005: Paul Lo Duca was traded by the Florida Marlins to the New York Mets for Dante Brinkley (minors) and Gaby Hernandez (minors).
December 7, 2005: Juan Pierre was traded by the Florida Marlins to the Chicago Cubs for Sergio Mitre, Ricky Nolasco, and Renyel Pinto.
December 8, 2005: Dan Uggla was drafted by the Florida Marlins from the Arizona Diamondbacks in the 2005 minor league draft.
December 15, 2005: Buddy Carlyle was signed as a free agent with the Florida Marlins.
January 15, 2006: Scott Seabol was signed as a free agent with the Florida Marlins.

Regular season

Season standings

National League East

Record vs. opponents

Transactions
May 18, 2006: Buddy Carlyle was released by the Florida Marlins.
July 15, 2006: Scott Seabol was released by the Florida Marlins.

Roster

Player stats

Offense
The team hit more home runs than the 2005 Marlins, hitting 182 home runs this season as opposed to 128 home runs the previous year.

Batting

Starters by position 
Note: Pos = Position; G = Games played; AB = At bats; H = Hits; Avg. = Batting average; HR = Home runs; RBI = Runs batted in

Other batters
Note: G = Games played; AB = At bats; H = Hits; Avg. = Batting average; HR = Home runs; RBI = Runs batted in

Pitching

Starting pitchers 
Note: G = Games pitched; IP = Innings pitched; W = Wins; L = Losses; ERA = Earned run average; SO = Strikeouts

Other pitchers
Note: G = Games pitched; IP = Innings pitched; W = Wins; L = Losses; ERA = Earned run average; SO = Strikeouts

Relief pitchers
Note: G = Games pitched; IP = Innings pitched; W = Wins; L = Losses; SV = Saves; ERA = Earned run average; SO = Strikeouts

Farm system

References

Game Logs:
1st Half: Florida Marlins Game Log on ESPN.com
2nd Half: Florida Marlins Game Log on ESPN.com
Batting Statistics: Florida Marlins Batting Stats on ESPN.com
Pitching Statistics: Florida Marlins Pitching Stats on ESPN.com

2006 Florida Marlins at Baseball Almanac

Miami Marlins seasons
Florida Marlins
Miami